Power of the Hunter is the second album by heavy metal band Tank, released in 1982. The album was produced by Nigel Gray, better known for his work with The Police. "Crazy Horses" is a cover of the 1972 hit by The Osmonds.

Track listing 
All songs written by Tank, except where noted.
Side one
 "Walking Barefoot over Glass" – 5:31
 "Pure Hatred" – 3:51
 "Biting and Scratching" – 4:41
 "Some Came Running" – 3:03
 "T.A.N.K." – 3:51

Side two
"Used Leather (Hanging Loose)" – 4:21
 "Crazy Horses" (Alan Osmond, Wayne Osmond, Merrill Osmond) – 2:52
 "Set Your Back on Fire" – 3:57
 "Red Skull Rock" – 4:07
 "Power of the Hunter" – 4:10

CD edition bonus tracks
Since 2007, editions of the album have been available on CD with the following bonus tracks:

"Oh, What a Beautiful Morning" (Richard Rodgers, Oscar Hammerstein II) – 0:51
"Crazy Horses" (Osmond, Osmond, Osmond) (single version) – 2:30
"Filth Bitch Boogie" (B-Side of "Crazy Horses" single) – 4:27

Personnel 
Tank
 Algy Ward – vocals, bass
 Peter Brabbs – guitar
 Mark Brabbs – drums

Production
 Nigel Gray - producer, engineer
 Jim Ebdon - assistant engineer

References

1982 albums
Tank (band) albums
Albums produced by Nigel Gray